Johannes Hendrikus Adrianus Graafland (born 21 August 1909) was a Dutch football forward who was included in the Netherlands' squad at the 1934 FIFA World Cup. However, he never made an appearance for the national team. He also played for HBS Craeyenhout.

References

1909 births
Year of death missing
Dutch footballers
Association football forwards
1934 FIFA World Cup players
Footballers from Leeuwarden